The PAF Complex is a multi-use stadium in Islamabad, Pakistan.  It is currently used mostly for football matches at the club level by PAF FC of the Pakistan Premier League. The stadium has a capacity of 2,000 spectators.

References

Football venues in Pakistan
Sport in Islamabad
Buildings and structures in Islamabad